Usire is a 2001 Indian Kannada-language romance drama film directed by Prabhu Solomon. The film stars V. Ravichandran along with Rachana Banerjee and Prakash Raj in prominent roles.

The film is a remake of the Tamil film Bharathi Kannamma (1997), directed by Cheran. The film was produced by Rockline Venkatesh and the music was composed by Ilaiyaraaja.

The film, upon release, met with an average response at the box office. Prabhu Solomon had wanted Shiva Rajkumar to play the lead role, and he lamented that miscasting Ravichandran in the leading role instead, worked against the viability of the film.

Cast
 V. Ravichandran as Mutthu
 Rachana Banerjee as Chandri
 Prakash Raj as Rudregowda
 Sadhu Kokila
 Doddanna
 Sanjay Shantaram
 Chi Guru Dutt
 Shanythamma
 Madhura
 Krisohnegowda
 Jyothi
 Yuvraj N. as child artist

Soundtrack
All the songs are composed and scored by Ilaiyaraaja. The lyrics were written by K. Kalyan.

References

External links
 Year 2001 roundup

2001 films
2000s Kannada-language films
2001 romantic drama films
Kannada remakes of Tamil films
Films scored by Ilaiyaraaja
Films about social class
Indian romantic drama films
Discrimination in fiction
Rockline Entertainments films
Films directed by Prabhu Solomon